Folketing elections were held in Denmark on 22 September 1869. The Mellem Party emerged as the largest factions, winning 27 seats. Christian Emil Krag-Juel-Vind-Frijs remained Prime Minister.

Electoral system
The elections were held using first-past-the-post voting in single-member constituencies. Only 15% of the population was eligible to vote in the elections, with suffrage restricted to men over 30 who were not receiving poor relief (or who had not paid back any previous poor relief received), were not classed as "dependents" (those who were privately employed but did not have a household) and who had lived in their constituency for a certain length of time.

Results

References

Folketing
Elections in Denmark
Denmark
Denmark